, also known as Horyaku, was a  after Kan'en and before Meiwa. The period spanned the years from October 1751 through June 1764.

Change of era
 1751 : The new era of Hōreki (meaning "Valuable Calendar" or "Valuable Almanac") was said to have been created to mark the death of the retired Emperor Sakuramachi and the death of the former shōgun Tokugawa Yoshimune.

The previous era could be said to have ended and the new era is understood to have commenced in Kan'en 4, on the 27th day of the 10th month; however, this nengō was promulgated retroactively. The Keikō Kimon records that the calendar was amended by Imperial command, and the era was renamed Hōreki on December 2, 1754, which then would have become 19th day of the 10th month of the 4th year of Hōreki.

Events of the Hōreki era
 1752 (Hōreki 2): An ambassador arrived from the Ryūkyū Kingdom.
 1754 (Hōreki 4): The Hōreki River Improvement Incident
 1758 (Hōreki 8): The Hōreki incident involved a small number of kuge who favored a restoration of Imperial power; and this was construed as a threat by the shogunate.
 1760 (Hōreki 10): Shogun Ieshige resigns and his son, Ieharu, becomes the 10th shogun of the Tokugawa shogunate.
 1762 (Hōreki 12): The Emperor Momozono abdicated in favor of his sister; and he died shortly thereafter.
 1763 (Hōreki 13): A merchant association handling Korean ginseng is founded in the Kanda district of Edo.
 1764 (Hōreki 14): Sweet potatoes are exported from Edo to Korea. The food crop in Korea is the result of a diplomatic mission.

Notes

References
 Hall, John Whitney. (1988). Early Modern Japan (The Cambridge History of Japan, Vol. 4). Cambridge: Cambridge University Press. ;  OCLC 489633115
 Nussbaum, Louis Frédéric and Käthe Roth. (2005). Japan Encyclopedia. Cambridge: Harvard University Press. ; OCLC 48943301
 Ponsonby-Fane, Richard A. B. (1956). Kyoto: the Old Capital, 794-1869. Kyoto: Ponsonby-Fane Memorial.  OCLC 36644
 Titsingh, Isaac. (1834). Nihon Ōdai Ichiran; ou,  Annales des empereurs du Japon.  Paris: Royal Asiatic Society, Oriental Translation Fund of Great Britain and Ireland. OCLC 5850691.

External links 
 National Diet Library, "The Japanese Calendar" -- historical overview plus illustrative images from library's collection
 National Archives of Japan ...Clink link for map of Ogasawara Islands drawn in 2nd year of Horeki (1752)

Japanese eras
1750s in Japan
1760s in Japan